Libyan Canadians are Canadians of Libyan descent.

Most Libyan Canadians speak Arabic, English or French. According to the 2020 "Libyan-Canadian", there were 3,570 Canadians who claimed Libyan ancestry.

See also 

 Arab Canadians
 Libyan Americans

References 

Canadian people of Arab descent
Canadian people of Libyan descent
Arab Canadian
Canadian
Libyan Canadian
African Canadian